USS Joseph F. Bellows (SP-323) was a fishing boat purchased by the U.S. Navy during World War I. She was outfitted as an armed minesweeper and was assigned to the Virginia coast. Post-war she served as a tender and supply ship until sold in 1919.

Built in Maryland

Joseph F. Bellows (SP-323), a fishing steamer built in 1912 by E. J. Tull, Pocomoke City, Maryland, was acquired by the Navy from Bellows and Squires, Inc., Ocran, Virginia, in May 1917. She commissioned 18 May 1917.

World War I service

Assigned to the 5th Naval District at Norfolk, Virginia, Joseph F. Bellows operated as a minesweeper off Cape Henry and in the convoy channel to Hampton Roads, Virginia.

Post-war service

After the armistice ending World War I was signed, she acted as a lightship tender and a supply ship until July 1919.

Decommissioning and sale

Joseph F. Bellows was sold 2 July 1919 to NcNeal Dodson Co., Inc., Reedville, Virginia.

See also

References

External links
 photo gallery at navsource.org

World War I auxiliary ships of the United States
Tenders of the United States Navy
Ships built in Pocomoke City, Maryland
1912 ships
Minesweepers of the United States Navy
World War I minesweepers of the United States